Archips arcanus is a species of moth of the family Tortricidae. It is found in Zhejiang, China.

References

Moths described in 1977
Archips
Moths of Asia